Datuk Seri Dr. Dzulkefly bin Ahmad (Jawi: ذوالكفل بن أحمد; born 1 January 1956) is a Malaysian politician who served as the Minister of Health in the Pakatan Harapan (PH) administration under former Prime Minister Mahathir Mohamad from May 2018 to his resignation and the collapse of the PH administration in February 2020. He has served as the Member of Parliament (MP) for Kuala Selangor since May 2018 and from March 2008 to May 2013. He is a member the National Trust Party (AMANAH), a component party of PH opposition coalition. He was previously a member of the Pan-Malaysian Islamic Party (PAS), a former component party of the former Pakatan Rakyat (PR) and Barisan Alternatif (BA) opposition coalitions.

Dzulkefly had held the Kuala Selangor seat the first time  from March 2008 to May 2013 but under PAS for one term. He was one of the moderate and progressive G18 prominent members who were also referred as the "Erdogan" (after the Turkish politician Recep Tayyip Erdoğan) faction of PAS which was ousted at the 2015 PAS Muktamar. He together with other G18 leaders led by Mohamad Sabu had then launched Gerakan Harapan Baru (GHB) that founded AMANAH in 2015.

Early life
Dzulkefly holds a bachelor's degree from the University of Birmingham and a master's degree from the University of Surrey. He later completed his doctorate in toxicology from the Imperial College (St. Mary's Hospital Medical School) in 1993.

Career
Dzulkefly Ahmad was a lecturer at the Faculty of Medical Sciences, Universiti Sains Malaysia (USM) in Penang (1984-1989) and HUSM, Kelantan (1993-1997). He became a lecturer of Islamic civilization at USM (1987-1997). Dzulkefly is a former member of the British Toxicology Society (BTS) and the former Asia Pacific Association of Medical Toxicology (APAMT).

He is also the founder and Chairman of Jaiputra College Management Board, Kelantan (1999-2003), the first IPTS fully accredited by the Ministry of Education which conducts an integrated course of professionalism and religion. He is also a Consultant in an asset management company in Kuala Lumpur (1999-2001), a former Director (2003-2004) of a Public-Listed Company (PLC-Main Board). Senior Advisor of a Saudi-owned real estate company in Kuala Lumpur (2005-2007). International Education Company director, based in Oman (2017- now).

Political thinkers and political analysts
Dzulkefly has been the leader of the Student Movement in the United Kingdom (1970–80s), Jamaah Islah Malaysia (JIM) 1997–1998), director of Pusat PAS Research Center (1998–2009), Central PAS Work Committee (2004–present), AJK Lujnah Central Politics (2004–2015), AJK Guides for the Clean and Fair Elections (NET, 2006–present).

He has also written and commented on current issues in the print and electronic media and presents work at national and international levels (economic development, racial relations and clash of Western-Western civilization, Political Islam etc.). Since his involvement has resulted in several books in English and Bahasa Malaysia such as Blindspot (2003), Striving For Change (2007), Pergelutan Demi Perubahan (2016) and Najibnomiks: Rahmat atau Malapetaka? (2017).

He has led the Pas Research Center and after out of PAS, the Youth of AMANAH, and later assumed the position as Strategy Director of the AMANAH. As part of PAS think tank, he has helped produced "Negara Berkebajikan" book of PAS. He also produced the "Belanjawaan Alternatif" every year and Orange Book (Buku Jingga) when in Pakatan Rakyat (PR).

Members of the Thinking Group in Pakatan Harapan who produced Alternative Belties (2017 and 2018) and the publication of the Pakatan Harapan Manifesto namely "Buku Harapan". He is also active in writing as a columnist in The Edge magazine and media portals such as Malaysiakini, The Malaysian Insight, TMI, Free Malaysia Today.

Internationally and nationally, he is often invited to share his thoughts and experiences in 'Political Islam', the socio-economic development agenda and inter-religious issues and between civilizations.

Politics
Dzulkefly made his debut in the 1999 general election, contesting the Kapar parliamentary seat in Selangor for PAS but lost. In the 2004 general election, he contested the Rembau parliamentary seat in Negeri Sembilan but lost again. He was elected to Parliament in the 2008 general election, winning the seat of Kuala Selangor, which had been held by the ruling Barisan Nasional (BN) coalition.

In January 2010, Dr Dzulkefly publicly supported the controversial decision of the Malaysian High Court to allow a Catholic publication to use the term "Allah".

He lost his parliamentary seat in the 2013 general election, tallying 460 votes fewer than the Barisan Nasional candidate Irmohizam Ibrahim. Despite the loss, he was re-elected to the party's central committee. In the 2018 general election, he was re-elected again to the Parliament but as an AMANAH candidate.

Legal suits
On 31 December 2021, Dzulkefly Ahmad has filed a defamation suit against former prime minister Najib Razak following his allegations of nepotism and cronyism. Dzulkefly filed a statement of claim at Kuala Lumpur High Court, providing an August 24, 2020, Facebook post by Najib together with a Sinar Harian article dated January 28, 2019, as key evidence.

Election results

Honours

Honour of Malaysia
  :
  Grand Commander of the Exalted Order of Malacca (DGSM) – Datuk Seri (2018)

External links

References

Living people
1956 births
People from Negeri Sembilan
Malaysian people of Malay descent
Malaysian Muslims
Malaysian toxicologists
Former Malaysian Islamic Party politicians
National Trust Party (Malaysia) politicians
Members of the Johor State Legislative Assembly
Members of the Dewan Rakyat
Health ministers of Malaysia
Government ministers of Malaysia
Alumni of the University of Birmingham
Alumni of the University of Surrey
21st-century Malaysian politicians